Pokrovnik is a village in Blagoevgrad Municipality, in Blagoevgrad Province, Bulgaria. It is situated very close to Blagoevgrad on the right bank of Struma river.

References

Villages in Blagoevgrad Province